{{Taxobox
| domain = Bacteria
| phylum = Bacteroidota
| classis = Flavobacteria
| ordo = Flavobacteriales
| familia = Flavobacteriaceae
| genus = Hwangdonia
| genus_authority = Jung et al. 2013| type_species = Hwangdonia seohaensis| subdivision_ranks = Species
| subdivision = H. seohaensis| synonyms =
}}Hwangdonia is a Gram-negative, rod-shaped, aerobic and non-motile genus of bacteria from the family of Flavobacteriaceae with one known species (Hwangdonia seohaensis). Hwangdonia seohaensis'' has been isolated from sediments of tidal flat from Hwangdo in the Yellow Sea.

References

Flavobacteria
Bacteria genera
Monotypic bacteria genera
Taxa described in 2013